Finger Lakes State Park is a public recreation area consisting of  in Boone County near the city of Columbia, Missouri. The state park is unusual in that the site was reclaimed after having been strip mined for coal. It is one of two state parks in Missouri used for off-road vehicles. The history of the other, St. Joe State Park, is also connected with mining. It is adjacent to Rocky Fork Lakes Conservation Area.

History
Between 1964 and 1967, the area was known as Peabody Coal's Mark Twain Mine, from which the company removed 1.2 million short tons (1.1 Tg) of coal. In 1974, Peabody donated the land to the state for use as a park. The state restored the site with federal grant money that was issued with the intent to demonstrate the conversion of strip-mined land to recreational use.

Features
A  corridor of water, created by joining small isolated lakes left from the mining operations, is used for canoeing, fishing, swimming, and scuba diving.

Activities and amenities
Activities at the park include camping, fishing, kayaking, picnicking, swimming, mountain biking, and ATV riding.

See also
 Surface Mining Control and Reclamation Act of 1977
 Peabody River State Fish and Wildlife Area: Illinois state park on reclaimed Peabody coal mines
 St. Joe State Park: Missouri state park on reclaimed lead mines

References

External links
Finger Lakes State Park Missouri Department of Natural Resources
Finger Lakes State Park Map Missouri Department of Natural Resources

State parks of Missouri
Protected areas of Boone County, Missouri
Landforms of Boone County, Missouri
Protected areas established in 1973
Mine reclamation
Peabody Energy